Washim district (Marathi pronunciation: [ʋaːʃim]) is a district in Maharashtra, India. The headquarters is at Washim.

Geography
Washim district is located in the western region of Vidharbha (20.1390° N, 77.1025° E). Akola lies to its north, Amravati lies to its north-east, Hingoli lies to its south, Buldhana lies to its west, Yavatmal lies to its east. River Penganga is the main river of the district. It flows through the Tehsil of Risod. Later it flows through the boundary of Washim and Hingoli districts. River Kas is the main tributary of Penganga. River Kas meets Penganga about 1 km from the village of Shelgaon Rajgure. River Arunavati and its tributaries originates in the Tehsil of Washim and them flows through the tehsils of Mangrul Pir and Manora into the district of Yavatmal. River Katepurna originates in the hilly areas of the district and flows northwards through the tehsil of Malegaon and enters the Akola district.

There are hilly ranges extending from through the tehsils of Malegaon, Washim, Mangrul Pir and Manora. There is plain region in the basins of River Penganga in the Risod Tehsil. The important cities are Washim, Risod, Karanja, Malegaon, Mangrul Pir, Manora and Shirpur. Washim is the largest city in the district. There are many well known hospitals, Schools, Colleges and Banks in Washim City. It is specially famous for its Balaji Temple. It also has a railway junction. By railway is connected to Akola, Purna, Nanded and Khandwa. Karanja is another city. It has another railway junction. There are some parts covered by the forests. There are mainly two regions. Both the regions are protected under Katepurna Wildlife Sanctuary and Karanja Sohol Wildlife Sanctuary respectively.

History
Washim was once known as Vatsagulma, the capital of the Vatsagulma line of Vakataka dynasty. The Vatsagulma branch was founded by Sarvasena, the second son of Pravarasena I after his death. King Sarvasena made Vatsagulma, the present day Washim, in Washim district of Maharashtra his capital. The territory ruled by this branch was between the Sahydri Range and the Godavari River. They patronized some of the Buddhist caves at Ajanta.

The account of Berar in the Ain-i-Akbari was added to that work in 1596–97. The greater part of the Akola district was included in Akbar's sorkar or revenue district of Narnala, but some of the parganas of this Sarkar are now included in Buldhana, while Akola, on the other hand, includes three parganas of Akbar's revenue district of Bashim. The whole revenue demand for the area now included in the Akola district seems to have been nearly twenty-four lakhs of rupees.

The only special notice of any places in the District has reference to Balapur, Shahpur, and Bashim. Near Balapur, says Abdul Fazl, are two streams, about the borders of which are found various kinds of pretty stones, which are cut and kept as curiosities. Six kos distant were the headquarters of Sultan Murad, which grew into a fine city under the name of Shahpur'. Of Bashim he writes, 'About Bashim is an Indigenous race, for the most part proud and refractory, called Hatkars their forces consist of 1000 cavalry and 5000 infantry.' He adds that the Hatkars, who are Dhangar, are Rajput which is true.

Washim district was formed on 1 July 1998. In the year 1905, during the period of the British Raj, Washim district was bifurcated into two separate districts, namely, Akola District and Yavatmal District. Then Wasim was part of Akola district and depended on Akola district for its governance. It again became a district in 1998 when people from Akola district wanted to separate from Wasim for its development.

Divisions
This district is divided into three sub-divisions, namely, Washim, Mangrulpir and Karanja. These are further divided into six talukas (tehsils). The talukas are Malegaon, Mangrulpir, Karanja, Manora, Washim and Risod.

Presently, there are three Vidhan Sabha (Legislative Assembly) constituencies in this district. These are Karanja, Risod and Washim. While, Risod is part of Akola Lok Sabha constituency, Karanja and Washim are part of Yavatmal-Washim Lok Sabha constituency.

Demographics
According to the 2011 census Washim district has a population of 1,197,160, roughly equal to the nation of Timor-Leste or the US state of Rhode Island. This gives it a ranking of 398th in India (out of a total of 640). 
Its population growth rate over the decade 2001-2011 was 17.23%. Washim has a sex ratio of 926 females for every 1000 males, and a literacy rate of 81.7%. 17.66% of the population lived in urban areas. Scheduled Castes and Scheduled Tribes made up 19.17% and 6.72% of the population respectively.

 

At the time of the 2011 Census of India, 75.88% of the population in the district spoke Marathi, 8.51% Lambadi, 8.26% Urdu and 4.98% Hindi as their first language.

Localities
 

Medshi

References

External links

 Washim district official website

 
Districts of Maharashtra
1998 establishments in Maharashtra
Amravati division
Minority Concentrated Districts in India
Vidarbha